Amata luzonensis is a moth of the subfamily Arctiinae. It was described by Wileman and West in 1925. It is found in the Philippines.

References

luzonensis
Moths described in 1925